Meysam Khayyam (born 4 May 1992) is an Iranian professional futsal player. He is currently a member of Crop in the Iranian Futsal Super League.

Honours

Country 
 Asian Indoor and Martial Arts Games
 Champion (1): 2013

Club 
 Iranian Futsal Super League
 Champion (1): 2019–20 (Mes Sungun)

References 

1992 births
Living people
People from Kerman
Iranian men's futsal players
Futsal forwards
Foolad Mahan FSC players
Shahid Mansouri FSC players
Mes Sungun FSC players
Giti Pasand FSC players
21st-century Iranian people